The 1150s BC is a decade which lasted from 1159 BC to 1150 BC.

Events and trends
1159 BC—The Hekla 3 eruption triggers an 18-year period of climatic worsening. (estimated date, disputed)
1154 BC—Death of King Menelaus of Sparta (estimated date), thirty years after the traditional date for the Fall of Troy in the Homeric Trojan War.
1154 BC—Medinet Habu (temple): records a people called the P-r-s-t (conventionally Peleset) among those who fought with Egypt in Ramesses III's reign.
1152 BC, 14 November—First historically confirmed workers' strike, under Pharaoh Ramses III in ancient Egypt.
1150 BC—Demophon, King of Athens and veteran of the Trojan War, dies after a reign of 33 years and is succeeded by his son Oxyntes.

Significant people
 1153 BC—Death of pharaoh Ramesses III of Egypt
 Nebuchadnezzar I, king of Babylon, is born (approximate date).

References